The Whitehall Tunnel in Allegheny County, Pennsylvania was originally built by the B&O Railroad in 1899 as a double-track tunnel. The tunnel was completed in 1900.
It was part of the Baltimore and Ohio Short Line Railroad, and allowed the B&O to bypass its former route into Pittsburgh along the Pittsburgh Southern and Little Saw Mill Run Railroad.   One worker, Antonio De Bono, was killed during its construction.

It is currently a single-track tunnel, owned by the Allegheny Valley Railroad.  The tunnel is approached from Glenwood in the south, up a steep grade along the Streets Run valley to the northern end of the tunnel.  The line continues from the southern end to Bruceton, Pennsylvania.

Dimensions:
 at base;
 at spring line;
 from top of rail to top of arch rise

Engineer: W. T. Manning; Bennet & Talbot, subcontractor, 1901–02

References

Baltimore and Ohio Railroad tunnels
Railroad tunnels in Pennsylvania
Tunnels in Allegheny County, Pennsylvania